Shorea amplexicaulis is a tree in the family Dipterocarpaceae, native to Borneo. The specific epithet amplexicaulis means "clasping the stem" and refers to the position of the leaf stalk or petiole.

Description
It has buttresses. The smooth bark is greyish brown.

Distribution and habitat
Shorea amplexicaulis is endemic to Borneo. Its habitat is mixed dipterocarp forests, up to  elevation.

Conservation
Shorea amplexicaulis has been assessed as near threatened on the IUCN Red List. It is threatened by conversion of land for plantations and by logging for its timber. The species is found in some protected areas.

References

amplexicaulis
Endemic flora of Borneo
Flora of the Borneo lowland rain forests
Plants described in 1962